The Men's 400m athletics events for the 2012 Summer Paralympics took place at the London Olympic Stadium from September 2 to September 8. A total of 10 events were contested over this distance for 10 different classifications.

Schedule

Results

T11

 

 
Final

T12

 

 
Final

T13

 

 
Final

T36

 
There were no heats in this event. The final was competed on 4 September 2012 at 20:45.
 
Final

T38

 

 
Final

T44

 

 
Final
 
Competed 8 September 2012 at 21:57.

T46

 

 
Final
 
Competed 4 September 2012 at 20:54.

T52

 

 
Final
 
Competed 3 September 2012 at 19:48.

T53

 

 
Final
 
Competed 2 September 2012 at 20:11.

T54

 

 
Final
 
Competed 7 September 2012 at 20:47.

References

Athletics at the 2012 Summer Paralympics